The 2013–14 season was Maccabi Haifa's 56th season in Israeli Premier League, and their 32nd consecutive season in the top division of Israeli football.

Club

Squad

Last updated on 11 March 2014

 The games play include all appearances (League, State Cup, Toto cup and Europa)

Players out on loan

Transfers

Summer transfers

Winter transfers

Current coaching staff

{|class="wikitable"
|+
! style="background-color:white; color:black;" scope="col"|Position
! style="background-color:white; color:black;" scope="col"|Staff
|-

Pre-season and friendlies

Competitions

Ligat Ha'Al

Regular season

Table

Play-off

Table

Results summary

Results by round

State Cup

Eighth Round

Europa League

Qualifying

Maccabi Haifa won 10-0 on aggregate

Maccabi Haifa won 3–0 on aggregate

Maccabi Haifa won 3–1 on aggregate

Group stage

Squad statistics

Updated on 21 May  2014

Goals

Disciplinary record

Disciplinary record Europa League

Penalties

Overall
{| class="wikitable" style="text-align: center"
|-
!
!Total
!Home
!Away
|-
|align=left| Games played          || 49 || 24 || 25
|-
|align=left| Games won             || 20 || 13 || 7
|-
|align=left| Games drawn           || 12 || 6 || 6
|-
|align=left| Games lost            || 16 || 7 || 9
|-
|align=left| Biggest win           || 8–0 vs  Khazar Lankaran || 3–0 vs  Ventspils || 8–0 vs  Khazar Lankaran
|-
|align=left| Biggest loss          || 0–4 vs Hapoel Tel Aviv  || 0–3 vs Maccabi Tel Aviv || 0–4 vs Hapoel Tel Aviv 
|-
|align=left| Biggest win (League)  || 3–0 vs Maccabi Petah Tikva || 3–1 vs Ironi Kiryat Shmona  3-1 vs Hapoel Ra'anana  3-1 vs Hapoel Tel Aviv 2–0 vs Beitar Jerusalem|| 3–0 vs Maccabi Petah Tikva
|-
|align=left| Biggest win (Cup)    ||colspan=3|–
|-
|align=left| Biggest win (Europe) || 8–0 vs  Khazar Lankaran || 3–0 vs  Ventspils  || 8–0 vs  Khazar Lankaran
|-
|align=left| Biggest loss (League) || 0–4 vs Hapoel Tel Aviv   || 0–3 vs Maccabi Tel Aviv || 0–4 vs Hapoel Tel Aviv 
|-
|align=left| Biggest loss (Cup)    || 7-8 Hapoel Ra'anana ||  - || 7-8 Hapoel Ra'anana
|-
|align=left| Biggest loss (Europe) || 0–1 vs  AZ  || 0–1 vs  AZ  ||  0–2 vs  AZ
|-
|align=left| Clean sheets          || 12 || 7 || 5
|-
|align=left| Goals scored          || 71 || 37 || 34
|-
|align=left| Goals conceded        || 56 || 24 || 32
|-
|align=left| Goal difference       || +15 || +13 || +2
|-
|-
|-
|align=left| Yellow cards         || 105 || 55 || 50
|-
|align=left| Red cards            || 4 || 2 || 2
|-
|align=left| Most appearances     || align=left|  Alon Turgeman (45)   || colspan=2|–
|-
|align=left| Most minutes played  || align=left|  Alon Turgeman (3,572)|| colspan=2|–
|-
|align=left| Most goals           || align=left|  Alon Turgeman (19)  || colspan=2|–
|-
|align=left| Winning rate         || % || % || %

References

External links
 Maccabi Haifa website

Maccabi Haifa F.C. seasons
Maccabi Haifa
Maccabi Haifa